Peeter Algma (also Peeter Adamson; 6 December 1885 Holstre Parish (now Viljandi Parish), Kreis Fellin – 18 May 1951 Viljandi) was an Estonian politician. He was a member of I Riigikogu, representing the Estonian Social Democratic Workers' Party. He was a member of the assembly since 12 March 1923. He replaced Johannes Orik.

References

1885 births
1951 deaths
People from Viljandi Parish
People from Kreis Fellin
Estonian Social Democratic Workers' Party politicians
Members of the Riigikogu, 1920–1923